The Henry Norris Russell Lectureship is awarded each year by the American Astronomical Society in recognition of a lifetime of excellence in astronomical research. The idea for the lectureship came from then society President Harlow Shapley in 1945, who led the fund raising drive to collect $10,000 from the membership. One of the major contributors was the Mexican Ambassador to the United States, as Russell had been an important representative at the dedication ceremony for the Mexican National Observatory. The goal was reached in December 1946, using not a little amount of coercive language by Shapley. The first Russell lecturer was, naturally, fellow American astronomer Henry Norris Russell, for whom the award is named. Russell gave a lecture titled "The Royal Road of Eclipses" concerning eclipsing binary stars.

Previous lecturers
This list of lecturers is from the American Astronomical Society's website.

See also

 List of astronomy awards
 Henry Norris Russell Lectureship

References

Astronomy prizes
American Astronomical Society
Lecture series